Stanfield is an English surname deriving from the Old English 'stan' (meaning stony) and 'feld' (field). This toponymic surname originates from several possible locations in England: the village of Stanfield, Norfolk; the ancient township of Stansfield (near Todmorden), West Yorkshire; and the village of Stansfield, Suffolk. Other variants include Stansfield, Stansfeld, and Standfield.

Notable people with this surname include:

Stanfield (surname)
Politics

Canadian family of politicians:
 Frank Stanfield (1872–1931), Canadian politician and entrepreneur, 15th Lieutenant-Governor of Nova Scotia, (father of Robert and Frank Thomas)
 Frank Thomas Stanfield (1903–1967), Canadian politician, MP for Colchester—Hants, Nova Scotia (son of Frank)
 John Stanfield (1868–1934), Canadian politician and industrialist, Senator for Colchester, Nova Scotia, (brother of Frank)
 Robert Stanfield or Robert Lorne Stanfield (1914–2003), Canadian politician, Leader of the Progressive Conservative Party of Canada (1967–76), (son of Frank)

Others
 Abraham L. Stanfield or Abraham Lincoln Stanfield (1860–1927), American businessman and politician
 Robert N. Stanfield or Robert Nelson Stanfield (1877–1945), American politician and Senator for Oregon
 Sylvia Stanfield (b.1943), American diplomat and Ambassador to Brunei
 Thomas S. Stanfield (1816–1885), American politician and judge from Indiana

Business
 Ross H. Stanfield (1927–2010), Canadian mining promoter
 Richard Stanfield (1863–1950), British academic and civil engineer

Sports

Canadian family of professional ice hockey players:
 Jack Stanfield (b.1942), Canadian professional ice hockey player (brother of Fred and Jim)
 Jim Stanfield (1947–2009), Canadian professional ice hockey player (brother of Jack and Fred)
 Fred Stanfield (b.1944), Canadian professional ice hockey player (brother of Jack and Jim)

Others
 Andy Stanfield or Andrew William Stanfield (1927–85), American sprinter
 Edmundo Stanfield (1902–1960), Irish rugby union footballer
 Kevin Stanfield or Kevin Bruce Stanfield (b.1955), American Major League Baseball player
 Leon Stanfield (b.1934), Welsh international lawn bowler
 Olphert Stanfield or Olphert Martin Stanfield (1869–1952), Irish professional footballer
 Parker Stanfield (b.1990), American professional ice hockey player
 Vic Stanfield (b.1951), American professional ice hockey player

Arts

English family of Clarkson Frederick Stanfield, painter:
 Clarkson Frederick Stanfield (1793–1867), English marine painter
 Francis Stanfield (1835–1914), English Catholic priest and composer (son of Clarkson)
 George Clarkson Stanfield (1828–1878), English painter (son of Clarkson)
 James Field Stanfield (1749–1824), Irish actor, abolitionist, and author (father of Clarkson)

Others:
 James S. Stanfield, American academic and film producer
 Lakeith Stanfield (b.1991), American actor and musician
 The Stanfields (2008–present), Canadian rock music group 

Medicine
 [[Agnes von Kurowsk] pr Agnes von Kurowsky Stanfield (1892–1984), American nurse

Stanfield (given name) 
 Stanfield Wells (1889–1967), All-American football player
 Samuel Singer or Samuel Stanfield Singer (1920–1989), Scottish episcopal clergyman and Dean of Glasgow and Galloway

Fiction
 Marlo Stanfield (2002–8), character in The Wire
 Stanfield Organization (2002–8), criminal organization in The Wire

Standfield
Politics
 Thomas Standfield and John Standfield, two of the Tolpuddle Martyrs

Sports
 Barry Standfield (b.1970), Australian Rules footballer

See also
 Stansfield (disambiguation)
 Stansfield (surname)
 Stansfeld (surname)

References

English-language surnames